Pam Shriver was the defending champion and lost in the quarter-finals to Terry Phelps.

Martina Navratilova won in the final 6–2, 6–4 against Catarina Lindqvist.

Seeds
A champion seed is indicated in bold text while text in italics indicates the round in which that seed was eliminated. The top eight seeds received a bye to the second round.

  Martina Navratilova (champion)
  Pam Shriver (quarterfinals)
  Helena Suková (third round)
  Mary Joe Fernández (quarterfinals)
  Patty Fendick (quarterfinals)
  Raffaella Reggi (third round)
  Anne Minter (third round)
  Pascale Paradis (second round)
  Hana Mandlíková (semifinals)
  Nicole Provis (second round)
  Judith Wiesner (quarterfinals)
  Brenda Schultz (first round)
  Catarina Lindqvist (final)
  Gretchen Magers (third round)
  Ann Grossman (third round)
  Terry Phelps (semifinals)

Draw

Finals

Top half

Section 1

Section 2

Bottom half

Section 3

Section 4

References
 1989 New South Wales Open Draw

Women's Singles
Singles